600 series may refer to:

Japanese train types

 Keikyu 600 series, a train operated by Keikyu since 1994
 Keikyu 600 series, a train operated by Keikyu from 1956, which later became the Keikyu 700 series (1956)

 E1 Series Shinkansen, originally scheduled to be classified "600 series"

Computing and electronics
 600 series connector, the Australian standard telephone handset connector before the introduction of the RJ11 and RJ12 modular connectors
 GE-600 series mainframe computers
 GeForce 600 Series graphic processing units
 Radeon 600 series graphic processing units
 ThinkPad 600 series, a line of laptop computers

Other
 Bombardier Challenger 600 business jets
 Daimler-Benz DB 600 series aircraft engines
 French 600 Series submarines
 Italian 600 Series submarines
 Rover 600 Series car

See also
 Series 6 (disambiguation)
 6000 series (disambiguation)